Nevin McCaskill (born December 29, 1983) is a former American football guard. He was signed by the Buffalo Bills as an undrafted free agent in 2007. He played college football at Hampton.

McCaskill was also a member of the Philadelphia Eagles, Green Bay Packers, Miami Dolphins, Tennessee Titans, Pittsburgh Steelers, New York Jets, Washington Redskins and Tampa Bay Storm.

Early years
McCaskill attended and played football at Amos P. Godby High School in Tallahassee, Florida and was an All-State performer for the Cougars at offensive center.

College career
McCaskill attended and played collegiate football at Hampton University and was a member of the Second-team All-MEAC in 2005 as a Junior.

McCaskill majored in Graphic Design.

Professional career

Buffalo Bills
McCaskill was signed as an undrafted free agent on July 29, 2007. He was then released on September 1 but was re-signed to the Bills practice squad six days later on September 6. McCaskill was released from the Bills practice squad on September 27, 2007. McCaskill was signed again by the Bills on January 3, 2008 and participated in the Bills offseason workouts and mini camp sessions before the 2008 season. McCaskill was released by the Bills as a part of their cut down to the regular season league mandated 53 man roster on August 30, 2008.

Philadelphia Eagles
The Philadelphia Eagles signed McCaskill to their practice squad on October 21, 2008.

Green Bay Packers
The Green Bay Packers signed McCaskill to their active roster from the Eagles practice squad on December 11, 2008. He was waived on June 24, 2009.

New York Jets
McCaskill signed with the New York Jets on July 6, 2009. He was later released.

Miami Dolphins
McCaskill signed to the Dolphins Practice Squad on December 10, 2009. McCaskill was released on December 15, 2009.

Tennessee Titans
McCaskill signed a future contract with the Tennessee Titans on January 13, 2010. McCaskill was released on September 4, 2010

Pittsburgh Steelers
McCaskill signed a future contract with the Pittsburgh Steelers on January 6, 2011. He was waived on August 22.

Second stint with Jets
McCaskill was claimed off waivers by the New York Jets on August 24, 2011. He was waived on September 2.

Washington Redskins
On January 3, 2012, McCaskill signed a futures contract with the Washington Redskins. He was waived on July 25, 2012.

Tampa Bay Storm
McCaskill played the 2013 season with the Tampa Bay Storm of the Arena Football League. He was reassigned by the Storm on December 6, 2013.

References

External links
Hampton Pirates bio
New York Jets bio

1983 births
Living people
Players of American football from Florida
American football offensive tackles
American football offensive guards
Hampton Pirates football players
Buffalo Bills players
Philadelphia Eagles players
Green Bay Packers players
New York Jets players
Miami Dolphins players
Tennessee Titans players
Pittsburgh Steelers players
Tampa Bay Storm players